Glyne Gap Halt was a railway station located in East Sussex between Bexhill and Hastings. It was opened on 11 September 1905 by the London, Brighton and South Coast Railway (LBSCR), and closed ten years later.

See also 
 List of closed railway stations in Britain

References

 

Disused railway stations in East Sussex
Railway stations in Great Britain opened in 1905
Railway stations in Great Britain closed in 1915
Former London, Brighton and South Coast Railway stations
Rother District